Stigmella inopinata is a moth of the family Nepticulidae. It has only been recorded from Slovakia and the Near East.

External links
Fauna Europaea

Nepticulidae
Moths of Europe
Moths of Asia
Moths described in 1991